Pimagedine, also known as aminoguanidine, is an investigational drug for the treatment of diabetic nephropathy that is no longer under development as a drug. Pimagedine functions as an inhibitor of diamine oxidase and nitric oxide synthase. It acts to reduce levels of advanced glycation end products (AGEs) through interacting with 3-deoxyglucosone, glyoxal, methylglyoxal, and related dicarbonyls.  These reactive species are converted to less reactive heterocycles by this condensation reaction.

History
Pimagedine was under development as a drug for kidney diseases by the pharmaceutical company Alteon (now known Synvista Therapeutics Inc.) that was founded in 1986. In 1987, Alteon acquired a license to intellectual property relating to AGE inhibition from Rockefeller University. In 1989, Alteon and Marion Merrell Dow Inc (MMD) entered into a joint development program for pimagedine. In 1992, Alteon licensed a patent from Rockefeller University relating to the use of pimagedine to inhibit AGE formation. In 1995, Hoechst AG (now Sanofi-Aventis) acquired MMD and subsequently terminated its agreement with Alteon, which led Alteon to stop clinical trials, which caused some controversy. In 1997, Alteon and Genentech announced a collaboration  under which Genentech would fund development of pimagedine and would have the rights to sell the drug if it would be approved.

In March 1998, Alteon announced that it had been advised that it should discontinue its Phase III trial of pimagedine in non-insulin-dependent (type II) diabetes patients with overt nephropathy, after the trial's external safety monitoring committee found an increased risk of side effects in the treatment group.  In November 1998, Alteon announced that its Phase III trial for pimagedine as a treatment for end stage renal disease had failed to prove efficacy, which led Carl Gordon, a leading biotech analyst, to say: "It looks like pimagedine is probably finished." In February, 1999, Genentech ended its collaboration with Alteon to develop pimagedine. In April 1999 Alteon announced that it would cease development of pimagedine as a treatment for end stage renal disease but might consider continuing development in type 1 diabetic patients with overt nephropathy or progressive kidney disease. Alteon's 2000, 2001, 2002 annual reports indicated that it was not running any clinical trials on pimagedine but was seeking co-development partners. Alteon's 2003 and subsequent annual reports did not mention that Alteon was seeking partners for pimagedine, which indicated that efforts to interest other companies and investors had failed and which signaled that commercial efforts to develop pimagedine as a drug were indeed finished.

Chemistry

Synthesis 
The industrial synthesis uses the reaction between cyanamide and hydrazine in aqueous solution.

The compound can also be obtained from the reduction of nitroguanidine with zinc in acetic acid.

Properties 
Aminoguanidine is a colorless solid that is soluble in water and ethanol. It is basic, producing salts when reacted with organic acids. As established by many crystallographic studies, protonation of aminoguanidine occurs at the imino nitrogen. With formic acid, condensation occurs, leading to cyclization to give 3-amino-1,2,4-triazole.

The compound reacts with nitrous acid in acidic medium to give 5-aminotetrazole via the intermediate guanylazide. At neutral pH, the reaction leads to tetrazene. Diazotization in acetic acid yields 1,3-di-(tetrazolyl)-triazene.

References

Guanidines
Hydrazines